Chumma is a genus of African tangled nest spiders first described by Rudy Jocqué in 2001. They are small, three-clawed spiders with a strong dorsal scutum. They have no fovea, and the posterior and median spinnerets are reduced. The males of C. gastroperforata have two pairs of abdominal pockets that play a role in mating. This genus was initially placed in the family Chummidae, but the World Spider Catalog places it in Amaurobiidae.

Species
 it contains nine species in South Africa and neighboring countries:
Chumma bicolor Jocqué & Alderweireldt, 2018 – South Africa
Chumma foliata Jocqué & Alderweireldt, 2018 – South Africa
Chumma gastroperforata Jocqué, 2001 – South Africa
Chumma inquieta Jocqué, 2001 (type) – South Africa
Chumma interfluvialis Jocqué & Alderweireldt, 2018 – South Africa
Chumma lesotho Jocqué & Alderweireldt, 2018 – Lesotho
Chumma striata Jocqué & Alderweireldt, 2018 – South Africa
Chumma subridens Jocqué & Alderweireldt, 2018 – South Africa
Chumma tsitsikamma Jocqué & Alderweireldt, 2018 – South Africa

References

External links
 Jeremy Miller: Picture of a Chumma sp.

Spiders of South Africa
Araneomorphae genera
Amaurobiidae